Onofrio Puglisi, also known as Onofrio Pugliesi Sbernia (died on 11 January 1679), was an Italian mathematician from Palermo.

He was the first writer of accounting books in southern Italy.

Works

References

1679 deaths
17th-century Italian mathematicians
Mathematicians from Sicily